Financial intelligence (FININT) is the gathering of information about the financial affairs of entities of interest, to understand their nature and capabilities, and predict their intentions. Generally the term applies in the context of law enforcement and related activities. One of the main purposes of financial intelligence is to identify financial transactions that may involve tax evasion, money laundering or some other criminal activity. FININT may also be involved in identifying financing of criminal and terrorist organisations. Financial intelligence can be broken down into two main areas, collection and analysis.  Collection is normally done by a government agency, known as a financial intelligence organisation or Financial Intelligence Unit (FIU). The agency will collect raw transactional information and Suspicious activity reports (SAR) usually provided by banks and other entities as part of regulatory requirements. Data may be shared with other countries through intergovernmental networks. Analysis, may consist of scrutinizing a large volume of transactional data using data mining or data-matching techniques to identify persons potentially engaged in a particular activity. SARs can also be scrutinized and linked with other data to try to identify specific activity.

Collection
FININT involves scrutinizing a large volume of transactional data, usually provided by banks and other entities as part of regulatory requirements. Alternatively, data mining or data-matching techniques may be employed to identify persons potentially engaged in a particular activity. Many industrialized countries have regulatory reporting requirements for its financial organisations. It may be possible for the FININT organization to obtain access to raw data at a financial organization. From a legal standpoint, this type of collection can be quite complex. For example, the CIA obtained access to the Society for Worldwide Interbank Financial Telecommunication (SWIFT) data streams through the Terrorist Finance Tracking Program, but this violated Belgian privacy law. Reporting requirements may not affect Informal value transfer systems (IVTS) the use of which may simply be customary in a culture, and of amounts that would not require reporting if in a conventional financial institution. IVTS also can be used for criminal purposes of avoiding oversight.

Analysis
Examples of financial intelligence analysis could include:
 Identifying high-risk housing tenants on the basis of past rental histories.
 Detecting tax payers trying to avoid their fiduciary obligations by moving wealth surreptitiously out of a tax-levying jurisdiction.
 Discovering safe havens where criminals park the proceeds of crime.
 Accounting for how a large sum of money handed to a targeted individual disappears
 Checking to see if a corrupt individual has had any sudden and unexplained windfalls.
 Detecting relationships between terrorist cells through remittances.

Financial intelligence units
According to the Egmont Group of Financial Intelligence Units, financial intelligence units (FIUs) are national centres which collect information on suspicious or unusual financial activity from the financial industry and other entities or professions required to report suspicious transactions, suspected of being money laundering or terrorism financing. FIUs are normally not law enforcement agencies, but their mission is to process and analyze the information received. If sufficient evidence of unlawful activity is found, the matter is passed to public prosecutors.

FIUs may simply receive and process raw financial reports, and forward them, as appropriate, to law enforcement or intelligence agencies, include the multinational Egmont Group of Financial Intelligence Units, and national organizations. National FIUs include:

 Argentina – Unidad de Inteligencia Financiera 
 Australia – Australian Transaction Reports and Analysis Centre (AUSTRAC)
 Austria – Geldwäschemeldestelle im Bundeskriminalamt (A-FIU)
 Brazil – COAF Conselho de Controle de Atividade Financeira
 Canada – Financial Transactions and Reports Analysis Centre of Canada (FINTRAC)
 Cyprus - Unit for Combating Money Laundering (MOKAS)
 France – Tracfin
 Germany – Zentralstelle für Finanztransaktionsuntersuchungen
 India – Financial Intelligence Unit (India) (FIU-IND)
 Indonesia - Indonesian Financial Transaction Reports and Analysis Center (PPATK)
 Ireland – Garda Financial Intelligence Unit (GNECB FIU)
 Italy – Unità di Informazione Finanziaria per l'Italia (UIF)
 Malta – Financial Intelligence Analysis Unit (FIAU) 
 Mexico – Unidad de Inteligencia Financiera (UIF)
 Russia – Federal Financial Monitoring Service of the Russian Federation (Rosfinmonitoring)
 Saudi Arabia – General Directorate of Financial Intelligence (GDOFI)
 Spain – SEPBLAC
Turkey – Financial Crimes Investigation Board (MASAK)
 United Kingdom – National Crime Agency
 United States – Financial Crimes Enforcement Network (FinCEN)

United States examples 
The United States has different organizations focused on domestic and international financial activity.
The United States has several laws requiring the reporting to the FinCEN. These include the Right to Financial Privacy Act (RFPA) of 1978, the Bank Secrecy Act of 1970 (and other names of revisions), and the Gramm–Leach–Bliley Act of 1999 (GLBA). Some reports also need to go to the Securities and Exchange Commission.

Actions that can trigger an SAR being filed include:
Any kind of insider abuse of a financial institution, involving any amount;
Federal crimes against, or involving transactions conducted through, a financial institution that the financial institution detects and that involve at least $5,000 if a suspect can be identified, or at least $25,000 regardless of whether a suspect can be identified;
Transactions of at least $5,000 that the institution knows, suspects, or has reason to suspect involve funds from illegal activities or are structured to attempt to hide those funds;
Transactions of at least $5,000 that the institution knows, suspects or has reason to suspect are designed to evade any regulations promulgated under the Bankruptcy Secrecy Act; or
Transactions of at least $5,000 that the institution knows, suspects, or has reason to suspect have no business or apparent lawful purpose or are not the sort in which the particular customer would normally be expected to engage and for which the institution knows of no reasonable explanation after due investigation. The language of the RFPA indicates that a SAR filed under this rule comes from an individual transaction, not a profile of activities that make the transaction stand out.

International
International financial activity comes primarily from the Department of the Treasury and the Central Intelligence Agency. See CIA access to the Society for Worldwide Interbank Financial Telecommunication (SWIFT).

US domestic FININT
At the highest level, US domestic FININT, and also some international work, comes under the Under Secretary of the Treasury for Terrorism and Financial Intelligence, heading the Office of Terrorism and Financial Analysis, including:
Financial Crimes Enforcement Network: tracks domestic transactions
Office of Foreign Assets Control: focused on foreign assets in the US
Office of Intelligence and Analysis

Information developed by these units, when related to domestic security and especially when state and local law enforcement, is disseminated by the Office of Intelligence and Analysis (OIA) in the United States Department of Homeland Security, under the Under Secretary of Homeland Security for Intelligence and Analysis. This Office is not restricted to FININT, but handles collection, analysis and fusion of intelligence throughout the entire Department. It disseminates intelligence throughout the Department, to the other members of the United States Intelligence Community, and to affected first responders at the state and local level.

Depending on the specific Federal violation, law enforcement investigation may be under agencies including the Federal Bureau of Investigation, United States Secret Service, or the Internal Revenue Service.

Terrorist financing scenarios

Gems as an untraceable currency and source of income for terrorists
Following the September 11, 2001 attacks an allegation was made in The Wall Street Journal that tanzanite stones were being used as an untraceable currency and source of income for terrorists. This has not since been firmly established. See possible examples.

The custom common in Africa, uncut diamonds tend to be the de facto standard currency of the illicit small arms trade. Diamonds may be easily counted with a uniform valuation per carat to people in places of the world where there are no automated teller machines. An entire briefcase filled with uncut diamonds without the serial numbers found on refined precious metals can be used to make large illicit value transfers. The practice coexists with human trafficking, narcotics, weapons dealing, terrorism, and the evasion of economic sanctions and embargoes.

However, the Internal Revenue Service has since instituted new anti-money laundering regulations to control the gem trade.

Front-running the market in a terrorist attack
Another intriguing possibility is that a terrorist might buy stocks which are likely to appreciate in the event of a terrorist attack, such as defense industry stocks, or sell short stocks which are likely to depreciate, such as airlines. This possibility led to many investigations of the financial markets subsequent to the September 11, 2001 attacks.

European Financial Intelligence Unit Network 
The Financial Intelligence Unit Network (FIU.NET) is a decentralized computer network that provides an information exchange between the financial intelligence units of the European Union. FIU.NET is a decentralized system with no central database where the information is collected. All the connected FIUs have their FIU.NET equipment within their own premises and manage their own information. Through FIU.NET the connected FIUs create bilateral or multilateral cases. Ma3tch (autonomous, anonymous, analysis) is a matching tool within FIU.NET. Ma3tch makes it possible for FIUs to match names in order to find relevant data that is possessed by other connected FIUs. As the data is anonymized, there is no breaching of privacy and data protection rules.

Connected FIUs
FIU.NET is funded by the European Commission and participating FIUs. Currently, the connected EU Member State FIUs are: Austria, Belgium, Bulgaria, Cyprus, Denmark, Estonia, Finland, France, Germany, Greece, Hungary, Ireland, Italy, Latvia, Lithuania, Luxemburg, Malta, Netherlands, Poland, Portugal, Romania, Sweden, Slovenia, Slovakia, Spain, and the United Kingdom.

Governing body
FIU.NET is governed by a Board of Partners (BoP) formed by connected FIUs that have volunteered for a seat. The Board of Partners is chaired by an independent Director.

Project management
Daily operation of the system is managed by the FIU.NET Bureau, a project bureau of the Dutch Ministry of Justice and Security, which is housed in the Europol International headquarters in The Hague.

References

Further sources

fiu.net

Commercial crimes
Financial crime prevention
Intelligence gathering disciplines
Funding of terrorism